Cyamops laos is a species of fly.

References

laos
Insects described in 2000